Listronotus marshalli is a species of underwater weevil in the beetle family Curculionidae. It is found in North America.

References

Further reading

 
 

Cyclominae
Articles created by Qbugbot
Beetles described in 1981